Transcendental Étude No. 5 in B "Feux follets" (Wills o' the Wisp) is the fifth étude of the set of twelve Transcendental Études by Franz Liszt.

Difficulties 
As with the other works in the Études but one, Feux follets went through three versions, the first being Étude en douze exercices from 1826, the second being Douze grandes études from 1837, and third Douze études d'exécution trancendante, an 1851 revision of the 1837 set. It is this last version, from 1851, that is most often performed. Its rapid double-note passages in the right hand accompanied by wide broken intervals in the left are notoriously difficult to play. In addition, the passages are often asymmetrical and unpredictable. It reaches several climaxes that are technically demanding and ends in pianissimo arpeggios.  Despite the mechanical difficulties of the work, its greatest challenge lies in doing justice to its whimsical and mysterious character. Pianissimo and leggierissimo markings abound in the double-note sections, making it more difficult to play. It is singularly the most technically difficult piece of the whole set.

External links 
 

Transcendental 05
1852 compositions
Compositions in B-flat major